Aiguilles is a commune of the Hautes-Alpes department in southeastern France.

Geography
The village lies in the middle of the commune, on the right bank of the Guil, which flows southwest through the commune.

Population

See also
Communes of the Hautes-Alpes department
 Pic de Petit Rochebrune

References

Communes of Hautes-Alpes
Dauphiné